Thomas Forrest Main (1911–1990) was a psychiatrist and psychoanalyst who coined the term 'therapeutic community'. He is particularly remembered for his often cited paper, The Ailment (1957).

Life
Thomas Main was born on 25 February 1911 in Johannesburg, where his father was a mine manager who had emigrated there from England. At the start of World War I his mother returned to England with Thomas and his two sisters Isabella and Mary, while his father joined the South African Army. Main was educated at the Royal Grammar School, Newcastle-upon-Tyne before studying medicine at Durham University, graduating in 1933 and becoming a doctor in 1938. Specializing in psychiatry, he gained a Diploma in Psychological Medicine from Dublin in 1936. In 1937 he married Agnes Mary (Molly) McHaffie who also graduated in medicine at Durham University and who also became a psychoanalyst. They had three daughters and a son, Jennifer (Johns),<ref>{{cite book|title=The Ailment and other Psycho-Analytical Essays|editor=Johns, Jennifer|section=acknowledgments|location=London|publisher= Free Association Books|date= 1989|isbn=1-85343-105-2}}</ref> Deborah (Hutchinson), Ursula (Kretzschmar) and Andrew.

Main worked as superintendent at Gateshead Mental Hospital. During the Second World War he joined the Royal Army Medical Corps as an adviser in psychiatry, attaining the rank of lieutenant colonel and working at the Northfield Army Hospital for the treatment of war neuroses. The work conducted at Northfield is considered by many psychiatrists to have been the first example of an intentional therapeutic community. The principles developed at Northfield were also developed and adapted at Civil Resettlement Units established at the end of the war to help returning prisoners of war to adapt back to civilian society and for civilians to adapt to having these men back amongst them.

After the war Main joined the Cassel Hospital, as medical director in 1946 and continued working there for the next thirty years.

Training as a psychoanalyst under Michael Balint, he was supervised by Anna Freud, Melanie Klein and Paula Heimann. In 1974 he co-founded with Michael Balint the charitable Institute of Psychosexual Medicine in London. He served as its Life President. He also served as vice-president of the Royal College of Psychiatrists, and was a co-editor of the British Journal of Medical Psychology. He died in Barnes, London on 29 May 1990, aged 79.

His papers are held in the Archive of the British Psychoanalytic Society, whose member he was for many years.

Works
 The hospital as a therapeutic institution The Ailment and other Psycho-Analytical Essays, ed. Jennifer Johns, London: Free Association Books, 1989. . The noted essay, The Ailment, is a report of Main's detailed study of the feelings aroused in a team of nurses caring for a group of psychiatric patients with low potential for recovery. He found that a sedative would be used in the management of a patient "only at the moment when the nurse had reached the limit of her human resources and was no longer able to stand the patient’s problems without anxiety, impatience, guilt, anger or despair".
 Mothers with children on a psychiatric unit A fragment on mothering 
 Meanings of madness : psychiatry comes of ageReferences

Further reading
 Elizabeth Barnes, ed., Psychosocial nursing'', London, New York [etc.] Tavistock Publications, 1968. Papers written over the period 1946-1967 ... compiled as a tribute to T.F. Main.

External links
 The Institute of Psychosexual Medicine, official website

Analysands of Michael Balint
British Army personnel of World War II
British psychologists
British psychoanalysts
English psychiatrists
1911 births
1990 deaths
20th-century British medical doctors
20th-century psychologists
Group psychotherapists
Object relations theorists
People from Johannesburg
People from the London Borough of Richmond upon Thames
Royal Army Medical Corps officers
South African people of British descent
Therapeutic community
Alumni of Durham University College of Medicine